Princess Louisa Anne of Great Britain (19 March 1749 – 13 May 1768) was a grandchild of King George II and sister of King George III.

Life

Princess Louisa was born on 19 March 1749, at Leicester House, Westminster, London, and was christened there on 11 April. Her father was Frederick, Prince of Wales, eldest son of George II and Caroline of Ansbach. Her mother was Princess Augusta of Saxe-Gotha. Her godparents were her paternal uncle Prince Frederick of Hesse-Kassel and aunts the Queen of Denmark and the Princess of Orange, all of whom were represented by proxies. She was reportedly close to her sister Caroline Matilda, who was close in age and was raised with her.

Her health was delicate throughout her life. According to Walpole, she "never appeared more than an unhealthy child of thirteen or fourteen".
In 1764, negotiations were made between the British and Danish royal houses of a marriage between the Danish heir to the throne, Prince Christian, and a British princess. The marriage was considered suitable in status and welcomed by both houses, as there were few royal Protestant houses to choose between at that point for either party. The preferred choice for a bride was initially Princess Louisa, but after the Danish representative in London, Count Hans Caspar von Bothmer (1727-1787), was informed of her weak constitution, her younger sister Caroline Matilda was chosen for the match instead. The marriage was announced in Great Britain 10 January 1765.

The same year, 1764, she received a proposal from her brother's brother-in-law, Adolf Frederick of Mecklenburg-Strelitz, but negotiations were again deterred due to concerns regarding her health.

Reportedly, by the time her sister Caroline Matilda left Great Britain for Denmark in 1766, Louisa was succumbing to a more and more deteriorating state of health due to an advancing tuberculosis, which eventually turned her into an invalid.

Princess Louisa died, at Carlton House, London, on 13 May 1768, unmarried, and without issue, at the age of 19.

Ancestors

See also
List of British princesses

References
Henry Churchyard "Royal Genealogies, Part 10"
Sam Sloan "Big Combined Family Trees (pafg733)"

1749 births
1768 deaths
18th-century British people
18th-century British women
British princesses
House of Hanover
People from Westminster
Burials at Westminster Abbey
Children of Frederick, Prince of Wales